The mixed doubles badminton tournament at the 2020 Summer Olympics took place from 24 to 30 July at the Musashino Forest Sport Plaza at Tokyo. There were 16 pairs (32 players) from 15 nations competing.

Background
This was the 7th appearance of the event as a full medal event. Badminton was introduced as a demonstration sport in 1972, held again as an exhibition sport in 1988, and added to the full programme in 1992; the mixed doubles tournament was not held in 1992 but has been held since 1996.

The reigning champions were Tontowi Ahmad and Liliyana Natsir of Indonesia, who were not defending their title with both having retired. The top two qualifying pairs were both from China (the only nation to qualify two pairs): Zheng Siwei/Huang Yaqiong and Wang Yilyu/Huang Dongping. Zheng and Huang were also the reigning world champions.

Qualification

The badminton qualification system provided for 16 mixed doubles teams (32 players). Following revisions due to the COVID-19 pandemic, the qualifying periods were set between 29 April 2019 to 15 March 2020 and 4 January to 13 June 2021, with the ranking list of 15 June 2021 deciding qualification.

Qualification was done entirely through the ranking list. Nations with at least two pairs in the top 8 were able to send a maximum of 2 pairs (4 players); all other nations were limited to a single pair. Pairs were taken from the ranking list in order, respecting those national limits, until 16 pairs were selected. However, each continent was guaranteed to have at least one pair with the lowest-ranking pairs displaced if necessary to make room for a continental guarantee.

Competition format
The tournament started with a group phase round-robin. There were four groups of four teams each; the top two highest-ranked pairs from each group would move on to a knockout stage. The knockout stage was a three-round single-elimination tournament with a bronze-medal match.

Matches were played best-of-three games. Each game was played to 21, except that a pair must win by 2 unless the score reached 30–29.

Seeds
 (silver medalists)
{{flagIOCathlete|Wang Yilyu / Huang Dongping|CHN|2020 Summer}} (gold medalists)
 (quarter-finals)
 (quarter-finals)

Schedule
The tournament was held over a 7-day period, with 6 competition days and 1 open day.

Group stage

Group A

Group B

Group C

Group D

Finals
The quarter-finals are held on 28 July, the semi-finals on 29 July, and the medal matches on 30 July 2021.

References

External links
Group play 

Badminton at the 2020 Summer Olympics
Mixed events at the 2020 Summer Olympics
2020